The abbreviation ARDC may refer to:

Air Research and Development Command, later renamed the Air Force Systems Command
Amateur Radio Digital Communications, a mode using IP addresses beginning with 44.x
American Racing Drivers Club, a midget car racing sanctioning body in the East Coast of the United States
American Research and Development Corporation, an early venture capital investment firm founded in 1946
Attorney Registration and Disciplinary Commission, professional administrative entity that governs licensing and disciplinary actions for attorneys licensed to practice in the state of Illinois

Auxiliary Repair Dock, Concrete of the US Navy
Australian Research Data Commons, an initiative for research data in Australia